Agnieszka "Agnes" Pihlava (born ; born 19 March 1980) is a singer who came fourth in Idols Finland 2, the Finnish version of Pop Idol in 2005. She was born in Leszno, Poland.

Discography

Albums 
 "Idols: Finalistit 2005"
 "When the Night Falls" (2006)
 "Redemption (2009)"

Singles 
 "Haaveista totta" (2005)
 "I Thought We Were Lovers" (2006)
 "Danger in Love" [(2006) (Lyrics by Mr.Lordi from Lordi )]

Reference

External links 
 Agnes Website
 Agnes' MySpace page

1980 births
Living people
21st-century Finnish women singers
Idols (franchise) participants
Polish emigrants to Finland
People from Leszno
21st-century Polish women singers
21st-century Polish singers